Cassidy Davis (born 25 August 1994) is an Australian footballer, who currently plays for Newcastle Jets in the Australian W-League.

Club career

Davis signed with her hometown club Newcastle Jets in 2013. 
She began her career playing in an attacking midfield role for the Jets, however over time she moved into a more defensive position. Davis became the club's Co-Captain ahead of the 2018-19 season alongside Gema Simon and Emily van Egmond. On Matchday 3 of the 2021-22 season Davis played her 100th consecutive A-League Women match, a league record. In March 2022, Davis made her 109th consecutive appearance in the top flight of Australian soccer. She therefore set the record for most consecutive top flight games in Australia for either a male or female, beating the record previously held by Nikolai Topor-Stanley.

References

Living people
Australian women's soccer players
Newcastle Jets FC (A-League Women) players
Women's association football midfielders
1994 births